Christian Frederick Post (an anglicanization of Christian Friedrich Post) (1710 Polish Prussia - 29 April 1785 Germantown, Pennsylvania) was a missionary of the Moravian Church to the indigenous peoples of the Americas who played a brief but significant role in Colonial diplomacy.

Biography
He came to Pennsylvania in 1742, and worked at forming groups of German heritage into a church federation, but was unsuited to the task. His facility in learning the native languages suited him better to organizing native groups. Between 1743 and 1749 was a missionary to the Moravian Indians in Province of New York and Connecticut Colony. His and his co-workers' activities were viewed with suspicion by the settlers: he was expelled from New York and Connecticut once, and another time he was jailed in New York for seven weeks.

He returned to Europe in 1751, and thence was sent to Labrador, but afterward he came again to Pennsylvania, and was again employed in the Indian missions. Following the 1755 Penn's Creek Massacre, in 1758 he undertook an embassy in behalf of the Pennsylvania Colony to the Delawares and Shawnees in Ohio. He established an independent mission in Ohio in 1761, where he was joined in 1762 by John Heckewelder; but the Pontiac War forced them to abandon the project. In January, 1764, he sailed for the Mosquito Coast, where he labored two years, and he made a second visit there in 1767. He afterward united with the Church of England. He was elected to the American Society in 1768. 

He retired in 1784, leaving the Miskito Indians to live in Germantown.

Family
He was married three times.  His first two wives were native converts:  Rachel, a Wampanoag, married him in 1743 and died about 1745, and Agnes, a Delaware, married him in 1747 and died in 1751.  In 1763, he married Mary Margaret Stadelman Bolinger who survived him, dying in 1810.  He had four children with his native wives; all died in infancy.

Notes

References

Further reading
  This tells the story of his 1758 mission during the French and Indian War.

External links
  Last resting place in Germantown, PA., at findagrave.com
  Pennsylvania state roadside marker noting how Post's friendship with the Indians and the threat of Forbes' army on Pittsburgh led to the collapse of the French presence in the western territories (and thereby by inference the dominance of English as the spoken language in the expanding colonization).
  Site on the early history of Western Pennsylvania including a segment on a marker denoting the location of the Kuskuskies Amerindian village where Post is said to have concluded a treaty with the Native Americans residing there under King Beaver (Tamaqua).
  Notes on the park near Slippery Rock, PA, where the marker locating the spot where Post met with King Beaver is found.

1710 births
1785 deaths
American Protestant missionaries
People of Pennsylvania of Pontiac's War
American people of the Moravian Church
Moravian Church missionaries
People of colonial Pennsylvania
18th-century American Episcopalians
Protestant missionaries in the United States